By Any Means may refer to:
By Any Means (2008 TV series), a BBC documentary television series
By Any Means (2013 TV series), a BBC crime television series
Right to the Edge: Sydney to Tokyo by Any Means also known as By Any Means 2, a 2009 adventure series
By Any Means (mixtape), a mixtape by rapper Kevin Gates
By Any Means (film), a 2016 independent film

See also
By any means necessary (disambiguation)